Ingrid Schmidt (born 3 March 1945) is a German former backstroke swimmer. She competed at the 1960 and 1964 Summer Olympics and won a bronze medal in the 4 × 100 m medley relay in 1960. In 1964 her team was disqualified in the same event.

At the 1962 European Aquatics Championships, she won a gold medal in the same 4 × 100 m medley event, setting the new world record. For this achievement, the four team members were named German Sportspersonalities of the Year in the team category in 1962.

References

1945 births
Living people
German female swimmers
Female backstroke swimmers
Olympic swimmers of the United Team of Germany
Swimmers at the 1960 Summer Olympics
Swimmers at the 1964 Summer Olympics
Olympic bronze medalists for the United Team of Germany
Olympic bronze medalists in swimming
European Aquatics Championships medalists in swimming
Medalists at the 1960 Summer Olympics
People from Rudolstadt
Sportspeople from Thuringia